Leonard Sorkin (January 12, 1916 – June 7, 1985) was an American violinist.

Sorkin was born in Chicago in 1916. He received violin training from Mischa Mischakoff.  At the age of 18, he joined the Chicago Symphony Orchestra, where he remained until 1943. Sorkin served as concertmaster of the ABC Symphony from 1946 to 1954. In 1946, he helped found the Fine Arts Quartet, in which he played first violin until 1982. In 1983, Sorkin became founding director of the Institute of Chamber Music at the University of Wisconsin–Milwaukee.

Sorkin was married to Aviva Dolnick Sorkin (died March 16, 2009), who danced for many years with the Sybil Shearer Dance Company. He died in 1985 of cancer in Milwaukee, Wisconsin. He is buried in Greenwood Cemetery in Milwaukee, Wisconsin. He is the father of the theoretical physicist Rafael Sorkin and daughter Ballerina and Actress Naomi Sorkin

Awards
New York Times Chamber Music Record of the Year
Wisconsin Governor's Award for Outstanding Contributions to the Performing Arts
Artist-Teacher of the Year, American String Teachers Association

Notes

External links
History and Discography with the Fine Arts Quartet
Leonard Sorkin Papers
Interview with Studs Terkel

1916 births
1985 deaths
American classical violinists
Male classical violinists
American male violinists
Jewish classical violinists
University of Wisconsin–Milwaukee faculty
Musicians from Milwaukee
Musicians from Chicago
20th-century classical violinists
Classical musicians from Illinois
Classical musicians from Wisconsin
20th-century American male musicians
20th-century American violinists